John Hales was a medieval Bishop of Exeter.

Hales was provided on 20 October 1455 but was never consecrated as he resigned about 4 February 1456.

Citations

References
 

Bishops of Exeter
15th-century English Roman Catholic bishops